The 2021 West Coast Conference women's basketball tournament was played March 4–9, 2021, at Orleans Arena in Las Vegas. The winner received the conference's automatic bid to the NCAA women's basketball tournament.

Seeds
All of the teams in the conference standings, except for San Diego, qualified for the tournament. San Diego cancelled their season after going 7–12, so they will not compete in the conference tournament. Teams are seeded based on the Ken Pomeroy Adjusted Conference Winning Percentage.

* Overall record at end of regular season.

Venue 
For the thirteenth consecutive year, the 2021 WCC Tournament will be held in the Orleans Arena. When the Orleans Arena is set up for basketball games, the seating capacity is 7,471. The tournament is scheduled to be held at the Orleans Arena at least until 2022. The Orleans Arena is located at the 1,886 room Orleans Hotel and Casino about 1 mile west of the Las Vegas Strip. The tickets for the WCC Tournament typically sell out quickly. Due to the COVID-19 pandemic, no fans were permitted to attend the tournament for the year 2021.

Schedule

Bracket
All games except the championship will air on BYUtv and be simulcast on WCC Network and multiple RSN's: NBC Sports Bay Area, Fox Sports Prime Ticket, Fox Sports San Diego, and Root Sports. The championship will air on ESPNU.

* denotes overtime game

See also

 2020-21 NCAA Division I women's basketball season
 West Coast Conference men's basketball tournament
 2021 West Coast Conference men's basketball tournament
 West Coast Conference women's basketball tournament

References

External links

Tournament
West Coast Conference women's basketball tournament
Basketball competitions in the Las Vegas Valley
College basketball tournaments in Nevada
Women's sports in Nevada
College sports tournaments in Nevada